Covington & Burling LLP is an American multinational law firm. Known as a white shoe law firm, the firm is headquartered in Washington, D.C. and advises clients on transactional, litigation, regulatory, and public policy matters.[2] In 2021, Vault.com ranked Covington & Burling as the #1 law firm in Washington, D.C.[3] The firm has additional offices in Beijing, Brussels, Frankfurt, Dubai, Johannesburg, London, Los Angeles, New York, Palo Alto, San Francisco, Seoul, and Shanghai.

History 
Judge J. Harry Covington and Edward B. Burling founded Covington & Burling in Washington, DC, on January 1, 1919.

In 1988, Covington opened a London office, followed by a Brussels office in 1990.  In 1999, Covington merged with a 60-lawyer New York firm called Howard, Smith & Levin and also opened its first West Coast office in San Francisco. In 2008, Covington entered into a strategic alliance with Institution Quraysh for Law & Policy (iQ), a Qatar-based transnational law firm and think-tank, for the joint provision of legal and consulting services in the Middle East. As of mid-2009, both firms share the same London office premises.

Pro bono 
Covington's pro bono work focuses on providing legal services to people in local communities. Attorneys at the firm can participate in a six-month rotation program and work at each of three DC-based legal service organizations: Neighborhood Legal Services Program, the Children's Law Center and Bread for the City.

Covington's pro bono work includes representation in Buckley v. Valeo, Griffin v. Illinois, and Korematsu v. United States.  However, the firm's pro bono program encompasses a range of areas, including freedom of expression and religion; civil rights and civil liberties; gay rights; family law; education; landlord/tenant; homelessness; employment; criminal and court-appointed cases; police misconduct; environmental law; fairness in government procurements and grants; intellectual property; non-profit incorporation and tax. They supported the District of Columbia in District of Columbia v. Heller which argues that the District's ban on the possession of handguns and its storage provisions for other firearms in the home is not implicated by the Second Amendment

Representation of Guantanamo Bay inmates 
Attorneys at Covington & Burling have been Guantanamo Bay attorneys for Ahmed al-Ghailani fifteen Yemenis, one Pakistani, and one Algerian being held at Guantanamo Bay. The firm obtained favorable rulings that detainees have rights under the Fifth Amendment and the Geneva Conventions.  The court ruled in March 2005 that the government could not transfer detainees from Guantanamo Bay to foreign custody without first giving the prisoners a chance to challenge the move in court.

According to The American Lawyer's annual pro bono survey, Covington lawyers spent 3,022 hours on Guantánamo litigation in 2007, "the firm's largest pro bono project that year". Lawyers from the firm who have become administration officials have been advised by ethics officials to recuse themselves in matters involving detainees represented by their former firms, but not from policy issues where they were not personally and substantially involved. Lanny Breuer is one of those who has had to recuse from some matters since leaving the firm for a government position. Covington also co-authored one of three petitioners' briefs filed in Boumediene v. Bush, "and was responsible for several detainee victories" in the U.S. Court of Appeals for the D.C. Circuit. "At least one high-ranking appointee played a key role in advancing detainees' rights," but they did not participate in litigation over the Guantanamo Bay prison itself.

Pro bono accolades 
First in Pro Bono Hours per Lawyer, 2019 and 2020—The American Lawyer
Law360, Pro Bono Firm of the Year, ranked No. 1 (2015).
DC Bar Association, Thurgood Marshall Award for commitment to excellence in the fields of civil rights and individual liberties (2006).

Recent notable clients

State of California 
The State of California hired Covington & Burling attorney and former Obama Attorney General Eric Holder to fight the Trump administration.

Commonwealth of Australia 
According to press reports and filings with the U.S. Department of Justice under the Foreign Agents Registration Act, Covington & Burling assisted the government of Australia in pursuing the legislation to create a new visa category reserved exclusively for nationals of Australia following the enactment of the U.S.-Australia Free Trade Agreement.  The Covington team included Stuart Eizenstat, Martin Gold, Roderick DeArment, David Marchick, Elizabeth Letchworth, Les Carnegie, and Brian Smith.  On November 20, 2012, the LegalTimes reported that the Embassy of South Korea had hired Covington & Burling to advise on a similar visa for Korea.  Covington of counsel Brian Smith and senior international policy adviser Alan Larson reportedly led the matter, assisted by senior counsel Martin Gold and associate Jonathan Wakely.

Current and former attorneys 

David Campion Acheson
Dean Acheson
Donald Alexander
Richard S. Arnold
Howard Berman
Stephanos Bibas
John R. Bolton
Kit Bond
Michael Boudin
Steven G. Bradbury
Lanny Breuer
William Bundy
Edward B. Burling
Vince Girdhari Chhabria
Abram Chayes
Michael Chertoff
W. Graham Claytor, Jr.
Christopher Reid Cooper
John Sherman Cooper
J. Harry Covington
Malik R. Dahlan
Roderick Allen DeArment
Joan Donoghue
John W. Douglas
John C. Dugan
Stuart E. Eizenstat
Leecia Eve
Adrian S. Fisher
Roger Fisher
Ivan K. Fong
Gerhard Gesell
Haywood Stirling Gilliam, Jr.
Jack L. Goldsmith
Lino Graglia
Coleman Hicks
Donald Hiss
Elie Honig
Eric Holder
Charles Antone Horsky
Philip K. Howard
Nicholas Johnson
Michael Karlan
Yale Kamisar
Harold Hongju Koh
Alex Kozinski
Jon Kyl
Robert D. Lenhard
Robert Lighthizer
Eugene Ludwig
Kenneth W. Mack
Gerard Magliocca
David Marchick
Burke Marshall
James C. McKay
David E. McGiffert
Roderick R. McKelvie
Terrell McSweeny
Richard A. Merrill
Richard Meserve
Sandra Douglass Morgan
Alfred H. Moses
David Nason
Dawn Clark Netsch
Kevin Newsom
John W. Nields Jr.
John Lord O'Brian
Mary Ellen O'Connell
Roberts Bishop Owen
David Remes
Gary R. Roberts
George Rublee
Charles Ruff
Arjun Singh Sethi
Andrew J. Shapiro
Brad Smith
Cameron Stracher
Paul Tagliabue
Phyllis D. Thompson
Paul Warnke
Togo D. West, Jr.
Josh Whitman
Sarah L. Wilson
Wesley S. Williams Jr.
Robert Eric Wone
Diane Wood

References

External links 
 
 National Law Review Profile

 
Intellectual property law firms
Biopharmaceutical law firms
Law firms established in 1919
Law firms based in Washington, D.C.
1919 establishments in Washington, D.C.